The Balochistan Development Authority is an agency of Government of Balochistan, Quetta. The authority was established in 1974 under the Balochistan Development Authority Act, 1974 passed by Balochistan Assembly.
The authority works under the Department of planning and development to promote economic and industrial development in Balochistan.

See also 
 Gwadar Development Authority
 Quetta Development Authority
 Gadani ship-breaking yard

References

External links 
 Balochistan Development Authority

Government agencies of Balochistan, Pakistan
1974 establishments in Pakistan
Government agencies established in 1974